Nathan Pretty (born 7 July 1973) is an Australian racecar driver.

Career
He first rose to prominence racing AUSCAR Superspeedway sedans (a Holden Commodore), becoming rookie of the year in his initial season in 1994. His family based race team built a V8 Supercar Commodore in 1998 racing with his sister Nicole at the 1998 FAI 1000. After racing as a privateer Pretty increasing gained more prestigious drives with other V8 Supercar teams and was a favourite of the factory supported teams, Holden Racing Team and K-mart Racing Team.

Pretty was part of the Garry Rogers Motorsport team that won the 2002 Bathurst 24 Hour driving alongside regular GRM driver Garth Tander, Steven Richards and Cameron McConville driving the controversial #427, 7.0 litre Holden Monaro 427C. Out of that win Pretty gained a full-time drive in 2003 in the 24 Hour winning Monaro in the Australian Nations Cup Championship. Pretty finished 3rd in the 2003 Australian Nations Cup Championship which included round wins at Symmons Plains Raceway in Tasmania and a surprise win at the tight Winton Motor Raceway in rural Victoria. In the 2003 championship he was joined as a team mate by legendary racer Peter Brock who was making a full-time comeback to racing after having initially retired at the end of 1997. Following the championship, Pretty and his 2002 co-drivers went on to finish 2nd in the 2003 Bathurst 24 Hour race, finishing less than a second behind their team mates Brock, Greg Murphy, Jason Bright and Todd Kelly in the second team Monaro.

Brock formed his own team to run Monaro's for himself and his son James in the 2004 Australian Nations Cup Championship while Pretty remained with Garry Rogers, running the original Bathurst 24 Hour Monaro. Pretty would finish the 2004 championship as runner up to the V12 Lamborghini Diablo GTR of defending series champion Paul Stokell. Along the way Pretty would set the class lap record at the Sandown Raceway. This would be the final year of the Nations Cup Championship as series owner Ross Palmer would be forced to close Procar Australia. This also forced the cancellation of the Bathurst 24 Hour race.

After spending 2005 largely on the sidelines, Pretty raced for Robert Smith's team in the 2006 Fujitsu V8 Supercar Series. Kelly spent three years at Perkins Engineering racing at Bathurst and racing the teams Commodore station wagon at the Bathurst 12 Hour. Pretty returned to full-time racing in 2011 in the V8 Utes series where he has been instantly competitive. In 2015, he raced in the Stadium Super Trucks at the Adelaide 500.

Pretty occasionally goes by the non-de-plume of Randy Corners where he parodies motor racing culture and racing drivers.

Career results
Results sourced from Driver Database.

Bathurst 1000

Bathurst 24 Hour

Stadium Super Trucks
(key) (Bold – Pole position. Italics – Fastest qualifier. * – Most laps led.)

References

External links 
 http://www.monsterenergy.com/au/en/athletes/nathan-pretty-2/

1973 births
Supercars Championship drivers
Stadium Super Trucks drivers
Living people
Sportspeople from Albury
Racing drivers from New South Wales
Kelly Racing drivers
Garry Rogers Motorsport drivers